Warwick School District is located in Lititz, Pennsylvania. The school district has a Superintendent, Dr. April Hershey; Assistant Superintendent, Dr. Melanie Calendar; Director of Secondary Curriculum, Instruction & Assessment, Dr. Steve Szobocsan and a Director of Elementary Curriculum, Instruction & Assessment, Dr. Lindsey Stock. It serves Elizabeth Township, Warwick Township, and Lititz Borough. It contains six schools, which include Warwick High School, Warwick Middle School, John Beck Elementary School, John Bonfield Elementary School, Kissel Hill Elementary School and Lititz Elementary School.

Warwick School District's colors are red and black and its mascot is the Warrior.  It is a member of the Pennsylvania Interscholastic Athletic Association, more specifically the Lancaster-Lebanon League, competing in Class AAA in most sports.

References

External links
 Warwick School District website

School districts in Lancaster County, Pennsylvania